The 2019–20 Belgian Cup, called the Croky Cup for sponsorship reasons, was the 65th season of Belgium's annual football cup competition. The competition began on 26 July 2019 and ended with the final on 1 August 2020. The winners of the competition qualified for the 2020–21 UEFA Europa League Group Stage. KV Mechelen were the defending champions, but were unable to defend their title as the club got banned from the competition for one season  after being found guilty of match-fixing as part of the 2017–19 Belgian football fraud scandal.

Competition format
The competition consisted of ten rounds. Except for the semi-finals, all rounds were single-match elimination rounds. When tied after 90 minutes in the first three rounds, penalties were taken immediately. In rounds four to seven and the quarterfinals, when tied after 90 minutes first an extra time period of 30 minutes were played, then penalties were taken if still necessary. The semi-finals were played over two legs, where the team winning on aggregate advanced. The final was played as a single match.

Teams entered the competition in different rounds, based upon their 2019–20 league affiliation. Teams from the fifth-level Belgian Third Amateur Division or lower began in round 1. Belgian Second Amateur Division teams entered in round 2, Belgian First Amateur Division teams entered in round 3, Belgian First Division B teams in round 5 and finally the Belgian First Division A teams entered in round 6. With KV Mechelen being banned from the competition, one of the Belgian First Division B teams (Union SG) was drawn randomly to receive a bye in round 5 and progressed automatically to round 6.

Round and draw dates

First round
This round of matches were played on 27, 28 & 29 July 2019 and included teams playing in the Belgian Third Amateur Division and Belgian Provincial Leagues. Teams from the Belgian Third Amateur Division were seeded and could not play each other.

Second round

Third round

Fourth round

Fifth round
Non-professional teams (tiers 3 and below) always receive the home advantage when playing professional teams, if their stadium meets the seating and safety requirements. As a result Lokeren and Roeselare had to give up their home advantage in this round.

Sixth round
The draw for the sixth round was made on 26 August 2019 and included the teams from the Belgian First Division A and Union SG, the latter replacing KV Mechelen which were banned from the competition after being found guilty of match-fixing. The 16 teams entering at this stage were seeded and could not meet each other.

Seventh Round
The draw for the seventh round was made immediately after the last game of the sixth round, between Antwerp and Lokeren, was finished. Only three teams outside the top division qualified for this round, with Rebecq from the Belgian Second Amateur Division the lowest still in the competition.

The matches will be played on 3, 4 and 5 of December 2019.

Quarter-finals
The draw for the quarter-finals was made immediately after the last game of the seventh round, between Excel Mouscron and Anderlecht was finished. Only one team from outside the top division remained at this stage of the competition, Union SG playing in the Belgian First Division B, who also reached the semifinals the previous season.

The matches were played on 17, 18 and 19 December 2019.

Semi-finals
The draw for the semi-finals was made immediately after the last game of the seventh round, between Anderlecht and Club Brugge was finished. The first leg matches were played on 22 and 23 January 2020, the second legs on 5 and 6 February 2020.

First Legs

Second Legs

Club Brugge win 3–2 on aggregate

Antwerp win 2–1 on aggregate

Final

Notes

References

Belgian Cup seasons
Belgian Cup
Cup
Belgian Cup